Chelemys delfini, also known as the Magellanic long-clawed akodont, is a species of rodent in the genus Chelemys of family Cricetidae. It is endemic to the areas of Punta Arenas and Torres del Paine National Park in southern Chile, where it lives in the grassland and scrub of the Magellanic steppe. It has sometimes been considered a subspecies of C. megalonyx.

References

Literature cited
D'Elia, G. and Pardinas, U. 2008. . In IUCN. IUCN Red List of Threatened Species. Version 2009.2. <www.iucnredlist.org>. Downloaded on January 12, 2010.

Mammals of Chile
Chelemys
Mammals described in 1905